Montego Bay is a city in Saint James, Jamaica. 

Montego Bay may also refer to:

Places

In Montego Bay
 Montego Bay High School, an all-girls high school
 Montego Bay railway station, a former railway station
 Montego Bay Sports Complex, a multi-purpose sports stadium

United States
 Montego Bay Resort, a hotel and casino in West Wendover, Nevada

Other uses
 "Montego Bay" (song), a 1970 song by Bobby Bloom

See also
 "Montego Bae", a 2018 hip hop song by Noname featuring Ravyn Lenae
 Montego (disambiguation)